Kang-e Shir Ali Khan (also Romanized as Kang-e Shīr ‘Alī Khān; also known as Kang-e Shīr ‘Alī) is a village in Jahanabad Rural District, in the Central District of Hirmand County, Sistan and Baluchestan Province, Iran. At the 2006 census, its population was 263, in 53 families.

References 

Populated places in Hirmand County